Thomas Henry Lunn (9 July 1883 – 1960) was an English professional footballer who played for Brownhills Albion, Wolverhampton Wanderers, Tottenham Hotspur, and Stockport County.

Football career 
Lunn began his career with Brownhills Albion before joining Wolverhampton Wanderers in 1904. The goalkeeper made 129 appearances for the Molineux club. Lunn collected a winners medal in the 1908 FA Cup Final.

In 1909, he signed for Tottenham Hotspur where he featured in a further 91 matches in all competitions between 1909–1912. He played regularly over the next two seasons but was replaced by John "Tiny" Joyce in 1912. He played two more games in early 1913, but on taking out a publican's licence, he was suspended for breach of contract.

Lunn went on to play for Stockport County where he ended his playing career.

Honours 
Wolverhampton Wanderers
 1908 FA Cup Final Winner

References

1883 births
1960 deaths
English footballers
Sportspeople from Bishop Auckland
Footballers from County Durham
English Football League players
Association football goalkeepers
Wolverhampton Wanderers F.C. players
Tottenham Hotspur F.C. players
Stockport County F.C. players
English Football League representative players
FA Cup Final players